Halfpenny is a surname. Notable people with the surname include:

Ben Halfpenny, English rugby league footballer of the 1920s and 1930s
Chelsea Halfpenny (born 1991), English actress
Jill Halfpenny, English actress
Leigh Halfpenny, Welsh rugby footballer
William Halfpenny,  English 18th-century architectural designer